Abralia multihamata is a species of enoploteuthid cephalopod native to the Northwest Pacific Ocean. Specifically, it occurs in the East China Sea, Sea of Japan and Sagami Bay. The taxonomic relationship between A. multihamata and A. spaercki needs to be resolved. It may spawn in the East China Sea, as large numbers of spent individuals are collected there in October.

References

Abralia
Molluscs described in 1929
Molluscs of the Pacific Ocean